Flato is a surname. Notable people with the surname include:

Charles Flato (1908–1984), American writer, American Communist Party member, and Soviet agent
Paul Flato (1900–1999), American jeweler
Stanisław Flato (1910–1972), Polish army intelligence officer and diplomat

See also
Lato (surname)